The 1985 Motorcaft Formula Ford Driver to Europe Series was an Australian motor racing competition open to Formula Ford racing cars. It was the 16th Australian Formula Ford Series and the first to be contested under the Motorcaft Formula Ford Driver to Europe Series name.

The series was won by Tomas Mezera  driving a Reynard.

Calendar

The series was contested over nine rounds with one race per round.

Round 3 was declared a "non-event" after all drivers were excluded from the results for failing to slow sufficiently following an accident.

Points system
Points were awarded on a 20-15-12-10-8-6-4-3-2-1 basis for the first ten positions at each round.

Series standings

Note: Australian Formula Ford regulations in 1985 required cars to be powered by a Ford 1600cc crossflow engine.

References

Formula Ford Driver to Europe Series
Australian Formula Ford Series